Juke Box Rhythm is a 1959 American musical film starring Brian Donlevy and Jo Morrow.

The film was released on a double bill with The Tingler (1959).

Plot
Preparing for her coronation, Princess Ann flies to New York City along with her Aunt Margaret, the countess, to do some shopping. At their hotel, in the room momentarily by herself, Ann hears music and inquires at the front desk about it. She discovers it is emanating from a college fraternity party on the hotel's fourth floor.

While listening outside, Ann is abruptly pulled into the room by Riff Manton, a college student who is also a singer. They dance together and Ann attempts to lose her inhibitions, but the impropriety of the situation compels her to leave without ever having identified herself.

Riff's father, George, is a theatrical producer. Separated from his wife of two decades, Martha, he is dating Leslie Anders, a wealthy socialite. Riff objects to this, although Leslie is offering to finance his father's next show.

Balenko, an aspiring dress designer, shows Riff a newspaper photo of him dancing with royalty and asks for an introduction to the princess. Riff is shocked to discover who she was. He is able to track her down, apologize and ingratiate himself to her. After persuading Ann to accompany him out for the evening, then scheming to ditch her disapproving chaperone Margaret, he takes her to a nightclub. The featured entertainer, George Jessel, invites the princess onto the stage, where they do a duet.

Ann is charmed by Balenko and orders 25 dresses from him. Balenko is so happy, he offers to use the money to finance Riff's father's show. An irritated Leslie ruins the tailor's reputation with the countess, who rescinds the order. Riff straightens everything out and his parents reunite. After being saddened by Princess Ann's departure, Riff then he is informed by Balenko that they both will be receiving invitations to the coronation.

Cast
 Jo Morrow as Princess Ann
 Jack Jones as Riff Manton
 Brian Donlevy as George Manton
 Frieda Inescort as Countess Margaret
 Karin Booth as Leslie Anders
 Marjorie Reynolds as Martha Manton
 Hans Conried as Balenko
 George Jessel as himself

Musical performers
 The Treniers
 Johnny Otis
 Earl Grant Trio
 The Nitwits (musical group)

According to media reports in Daily Variety, Bill Haley and His Comets were at one point announced as being in this film, but they do not appear.

References

External links

1959 films
Columbia Pictures films
American musical films
1959 musical films
Films directed by Arthur Dreifuss
1950s English-language films
1950s American films